Valerie Worth Bahlke (October 29, 1933 – July 31, 1994) was an American poet and writer of children's books under her maiden name, Valerie Worth.

Biography

Valerie Worth was born in Philadelphia, Pennsylvania and grew up in Swarthmore, Pennsylvania, where her father taught biology at Swarthmore College. In 1947, the family moved to Tampa, Florida for four years, and then spent a year in Bangalore, India. Worth returned to Swarthmore for college, where in 1955 she received an English Degree with High Honors. Shortly after graduation, she married George Bahlke. After a few peripatetic years, the couple eventually settled in Clinton, New York, where her husband taught at Kirkland College. At an informal writers group, Worth met Natalie Babbitt, whose husband, Samuel Fisher Babbitt, was the president of the university. Babbitt had published a few books at the time and recommended Worth's poems to her editor, Michael di Capua at Farrar, Straus & Giroux. Small Poems, Worth's first published collection, came out in 1972 accompanied by pen and ink illustrations by Babbitt; Babbitt also illustrated her subsequent volumes of "Small Poems", More Small Poems, Still More Small Poems, All the Small Poems, and All the Small Poems and Fourteen More. At Christmastime, a collection published in 1992, was illustrated by Antonio Frasconi and published by Michael Di Capua Books. In addition to poetry Worth also published two young adult novels, Gypsy Gold and Fox Hill, as well as Curlicues: The Fortunes of Two Pug Dogs, a  picture book also illustrated by Babbitt. Two posthumous poetry collections, Peacock and Other Poems and Animal Poems, were illustrated by Steve Jenkins, and Pug and Other Animal Poems, also illustrated by Jenkins, was scheduled to be published in 2013.

Awards
In 1991, Worth was awarded the NCTE Award for Excellence in Poetry for Children by the National Council of Teachers of English.

Works 
dog
The Crone's Book of Words (1971)
Small Poems (1972)
More Small Poems. (1976)
Still More Small Poems (1978) 
Curlicues: The Fortunes of Two Pug Dogs (1980)
Gypsy Gold (1983)
Fox Hill (1986)
Small Poems Again (1986)
All the Small Poems (1987)
The Crone's Book of Wisdom (1988)
At Christmastime (1992)
All the Small Poems and Fourteen More (1994)

References 

1933 births
1994 deaths
American women poets
20th-century American poets
20th-century American women writers